Miss Fatty's Seaside Lovers is a 1915 American short comedy film directed by and starring Fatty Arbuckle and featuring Harold Lloyd.

Cast
 Roscoe 'Fatty' Arbuckle as Finnegan's Daughter
 Joe Bordeaux as Short Masher
 Edgar Kennedy as Masher
 Harold Lloyd as Masher
 Billy Gilbert as Bellhop
 Wallace MacDonald as Masher

See also
 Fatty Arbuckle filmography
 Harold Lloyd filmography

References

External links

 Miss Fatty's Seaside Lovers on YouTube

1915 films
Films directed by Roscoe Arbuckle
Films produced by Mack Sennett
1915 comedy films
1915 short films
American silent short films
American black-and-white films
Silent American comedy films
Keystone Studios films
American comedy short films
1910s American films